Philip Sandeman Ziegler  (24 December 1929 – 22 February 2023) was a British biographer and historian.

Background
Ziegler was born in Ringwood, Hampshire on 24 December 1929, the son of Louis Ziegler, an Army officer, and Dora Barnwell, a homemaker. He was educated at St Cyprian's School, Eastbourne, and went with the school when it merged with Summer Fields School, Oxford. He attended Eton College and New College, Oxford, graduating in 1951 with a first class degree in Jurisprudence from Oxford before joining the British Foreign Service. In the Foreign Service, he served in Vientiane, Pretoria, and Bogotá, as well as with the Delegation to NATO in Paris.

Writing career
In 1967 he resigned from the Foreign Service, and joined the publishers Collins, which was at the time run by his father-in-law.  Originally intending to be a novelist, he began a career as biographer with his life of Talleyrand's lover, the Duchess of Dino. He was editor in chief at Collins from 1979 to 1980. He was chosen as official biographer of Edward VIII, for which he was appointed CVO. He has written in various journals and newspapers including The Spectator, The Listener, The Times, The Daily Telegraph and History Today.

Personal life and death
In 1967, gunmen broke into Ziegler's family home in Bogotá and shot dead his wife, Sarah Collins. Ziegler was wounded in the attack. Ziegler married social worker Mary Clare Charrington in 1971, she died in 2017. Ziegler died from cancer on 22 February 2023, at the age of 93.

Works
Duchess of Dino (1962) on Princess Dorothea of Courland
Addington: A Life of Henry Addington, First Viscount Sidmouth (1965)
The Black Death (1969)
King William IV (1971)
Omdurman (1973)
Melbourne : a Biography of William Lamb 2nd Viscount Melbourne (1976) on Lord Melbourne the Prime Minister
Crown and People (1978)
Diana Cooper (1981)
Mountbatten. The Official Biography (1985)
Elizabeth's Britain 1926 to 1986 (1986)
Diaries of Lord Louis Mountbatten 1920–1922: Tours with the Prince of Wales (1987) editor
Personal Diary of Admiral the Lord Louis Mountbatten, South-East Asia, 1943–1946 (1988)
The Sixth Great Power: Barings 1762–1929 (1988)
From Shore to Shore – The Final Years: The Diaries of Earl Mountbatten of Burma 1953–1979 (1989)
Edward VIII, the Official Biography (1990)
Brooks's: A Social History (1991) editor with Desmond Seward
Wilson: The Authorised Life of Lord Wilson of Rievaulx (1993) on Harold Wilson
London at War 1939–1945 (1995)
Osbert Sitwell (1998)
Britain Then and Now: The Francis Frith Collection (1999)
Soldiers: Fighting Men's Lives, 1901–2001 (2001)
Man Of Letters: The Extraordinary Life and Times of Literary Impresario Rupert Hart-Davis (2005)
Legacy: Cecil Rhodes, The Rhodes Trust and Rhodes Scholarships (Yale University Press, New Haven & London, 2008)
Edward Heath (Harper Press, 2010) 
 Olivier (MacLehose Press, 2013). 
 Between the Wars: 1919-1939 (MacLehose Press, 2016) 
 The Black Death (2016)

See also
 Harold Wilson: Bibliography#Selected titles about Harold Wilson

References

1929 births
2023 deaths
Alumni of New College, Oxford
British biographers
Fellows of the Royal Society of Literature
People educated at Eton College
People educated at St Cyprian's School
People educated at Summer Fields School
Commanders of the Royal Victorian Order
People from Ringwood, Hampshire